The 2023 Canberra Tennis International was a professional tennis tournament played on outdoor hard courts. It was the fifth edition of the tournament and was part of the 2023 ATP Challenger Tour and the 2023 ITF Women's World Tennis Tour. It took place in Canberra, Australia between 2 and 7 January 2023.

Men's singles main draw entrants

Seeds 

 1 Rankings as of 26 December 2022.

Other entrants 
The following players received a wildcard into the singles main draw:
  James McCabe
  Marc Polmans
  Dane Sweeny

The following player received entry into the singles main draw using a protected ranking:
  Bradley Klahn

The following players received entry from the qualifying draw:
  Liam Broady
  Enzo Couacaud
  Mitchell Krueger
  Francesco Maestrelli
  Alexandre Müller
  Emilio Nava

Champions

Men's singles

 Márton Fucsovics def.  Leandro Riedi 7–5, 6–4.

Women's singles

 Katie Boulter def.  Jodie Burrage 3–6, 6–3, 6–2

Men's doubles

 André Göransson /  Ben McLachlan def.  Andrew Harris /  John-Patrick Smith 6–3, 5–7, [10–5].

Women's doubles

 Irina Khromacheva /  Anastasia Tikhonova def.  Robin Anderson /  Hailey Baptiste 6–4, 7–5

References

2023 ITF Women's World Tennis Tour
2023 ATP Challenger Tour
2023 in Australian tennis
2023
January 2023 sports events in Australia